Vladimir Herzog Award (Portuguese: Prêmio Jornalistico Vladimir Herzog de Anistia e Direitos Humanos) is a Brazilian award for journalists who excel in the coverage of human rights issues in the national press. It was created in 1979 by the Journalists Sindicate of São Paulo.

History
The Vladimir Herzog Award for Human Rights was established in 1977, two years after the murder of journalist Vladimir Herzog in the dungeons of dictatorship, in order to encourage journalists in a time of strong censorship, to denounce the abuses that were committed then.

Today, the award continues its mission, rewarding stories that stimulate the quest for citizenship, denouncing all kinds of violation of human rights.

Categories
Every year, the ten categories are:
 Arts
 Photography
 Book-Report
Radio Report
 Internet Reporting
 TV – Picture
 TV – (Documentary)
 TV – Report (daily news)
 Magazine
 Newspaper

References

External links
Official site
Confira os ganhadores do XXVII Prêmio Jornalístico Vladimir Herzog de Anistia e Direitos Humanos

Journalism awards
Brazilian awards
Awards established in 1979
1979 establishments in Brazil
Brazilian journalism awards